It's Hard to Be Good is a 1948 British comedy film directed by Jeffrey Dell and starring Jimmy Hanley, Anne Crawford and Raymond Huntley. In the film, an ex-army officer finds his altruistic attempts to improve the world are unsuccessful.

It was shot at Denham Studios. The film's sets were designed by the art director Alex Vetchinsky.

Plot
On leaving the army, officer and war hero Captain James Gladstone Wedge (Jimmy Hanley) is full of idealism about bettering the world. He falls in love with Mary Leighton (Anne Crawford), who nursed him whilst he was recovering from his wartime injuries. He bungles a proposal to her at a railway station after being demobed, (Demobilization), but his good-nature had already convinced her that she should marry him.

Jimmy's attempts to promote goodwill and community spirit amongst his relatives and neighbours are always frustrated, due to their innate hostilities, which the latest collaborative war efforts did nothing to dispell. All his attempts at neighbourhood reconciliation having failed, and seeing that people have put their trust in the same status-quo of conflict after the war that existed before, Jimmy finally settles into a flat with Mary, and ends the film by loudly playing his trumpet in response to all the thoughtless noise around him, no longer caring what people might think.

Cast
 Anne Crawford as Mary Leighton
 Jimmy Hanley as Captain James Gladstone Wedge VC
 Raymond Huntley as Williams
 Edward Rigby as Parkinson
 Elwyn Brook-Jones as Budibent
 Joyce Carey as Alice Beckett
 Geoffrey Keen as Sergeant Todd
 Lana Morris as Daphne
 David Horne as Edward Beckett
 Muriel Aked as Ellen Beckett
 Cyril Smith as Fred Hobson
 Leslie Weston as Buck
 Alison Leggatt as Mrs Buck
 Robert Adair as Committee Man  
 Francis De Wolff as Fighting Neighbour  
 Judith Furse as Sister Taylor  
 Colin Gordon as Neighbour with Baby  
 Joan Hickson as Mending Woman  
 Sam Kydd as Husband  
 Leslie Perrins as Major Gordon  
 Wensley Pithey as Vicar  
 Walter Rilla as Kamerovsky
 John Salew as Committee Man  
 Marianne Stone as Clerk in Newspaper Office  
 Merle Tottenham as Mrs. Hobson  
 Ian Wilson as Fighting Neighbour
 Joan Newell as Woman Shopper
 Amy Dalby as Bargee's Wife (uncredited)
 Gwen Williams as Woman in Town Hall (uncredited)
 Dudley Williams as Barman (uncredited)
 Guy Verney as Lieutenant (uncredited)
 Isola Strong as Girl in Post Office (uncredited)
 HG Stoker as Elderly Man (uncredited)
 George Spence as Annoyed Neighbour (uncredited)
 John Singer as Cameraman (uncredited)
 Ian Selby as Pedestrian outside Buckingham Palace (uncredited)

Critical reception
In his book Forgotten British Film, Philip Gillett argued that "The satirical It's Hard to be Good (1948) deserves rescuing from obscurity, with its decorated hero looking for a niche in an uncaring peacetime world."

References

Bibliography
 Gillett, Philip. Forgotten British Film: Value and the Ephemeral in Postwar Cinema. Cambridge Scholars Publishing, 2017.

External links

1948 films
1948 comedy films
British black-and-white films
British comedy films
Films directed by Jeffrey Dell
Films scored by Antony Hopkins
Films set in London
Films shot at Denham Film Studios
British World War II films
1940s English-language films
1940s British films